Carlota Pereira de Queirós (13 February 1892 – 14 April 1982) was a Brazilian feminist and politician. She was the first woman to vote and be elected to the Brazilian parliament, and took part in writing the constitution of 1934.

References

1892 births
1982 deaths
Brazilian suffragists
Brazilian feminists
20th-century Brazilian women politicians